Arena Savaria is a multi-purpose indoor stadium in Szombathely, Hungary. It hosts a number of sport clubs from amateur to professional level, with 2007 Hungarian basketball championship winner Falco KC being its most notable tenant.

Features

The arena hosts the regional sports medicine complex and it also has an outdoor sports park with a number of sports fields.

Arena Savaria has 4,000 seating places for basketball events, that can be expanded by further 700 seats if necessary. For other events, such as concerts and shows, the figures can go up to 8,000, including standing places.

Other features:

 Recording studio
 Full theatre technic
 50 language translator system
 Accommodation inside the building of the arena
 Exclusive restaurant

Events
 2007 Aerobic European Championship
 Pannon Cup – International handball tournament
 Artistic Gymnastics World Cup
 X-Factor Tour – 2010, 2012
 Wrestling Golden Grand Prix
 FIG World Cup
 The Phantom of the Opera musical
 Savaria International Dance Competition
 Thompson concert
 Edvin Marton concert
 Adagio concert
 Horse Evolution Show (2013)
 Michael Flatley – Lord of the Dance Europe Tour (2014)
 EuroBasket Women 2015

References

External links
 Official website 

Indoor arenas in Hungary
Basketball venues in Hungary
Handball venues in Hungary
Music venues in Hungary
Buildings and structures in Vas County
Buildings and structures in Szombathely